The 1911 South Australian Football League season was the 35th season of the top-level Australian rules football competition in South Australia.

Ladder

1911 SAFL Finals

Grand Final

References 

SAFL
South Australian National Football League seasons